The following lists events that happened during 2011 in Bhutan.

Incumbents
 Monarch: Jigme Khesar Namgyel Wangchuck 
 Prime Minister: Jigme Thinley

Events

September
 September 18 – The 6.9  Sikkim earthquake shook northeastern India with a maximum Mercalli intensity of VII (Very strong), leaving 111 people dead.

October
 October 13 – The King of Bhutan, Jigme Khesar Namgyal Wangchuck, marries 21-year-old college student Jetsun Pema in Punakha.

References

 
2010s in Bhutan
Years of the 21st century in Bhutan
Bhutan
Bhutan